Liam Whyte was an Irish Fine Gael politician. He stood for election to Dáil Éireann as a Fine Gael candidate for the Tipperary North constituency at the 1961, 1969, 1973 and 1977 general elections but was unsuccessful on each occasion. He was elected to Seanad Éireann by the Agricultural Panel at the 1973 Seanad election. He lost his seat at the 1977 Seanad election.

References

Year of birth missing
Year of death missing
Fine Gael senators
Members of the 13th Seanad
Politicians from County Tipperary
Irish farmers